Rousettus is a genus of Old World fruit bats or megabats, referred to as rousette bats. The genus is a member of the family Pteropodidae. The genus consists of seven species that range over most of Africa to southeast Asia, and the islands of the south Pacific. They are among the few megabats capable of echolocation, and the only genus of megabats known to use vocal echolocation.

Classification
Genus Rousettus – rousette fruit bats
Geoffroy's rousette, R. amplexicaudatus
Egyptian fruit bat or Egyptian rousette, R. aegyptiacus
Leschenault's rousette, R. leschenaulti
Linduan rousette, R. linduensis
Comoro rousette, R. obliviosus
Bare-backed rousette, R. spinalatus
Madagascan rousette, R. madagascariensis
The species in the genera Boneia, Stenonycteris, and Pilonycteris were also formerly classified in Rousettus, but phylogenetic analysis supports them being their own genera.

References

 
Bat genera
Taxa named by John Edward Gray